Broughton East is a civil parish in the South Lakeland district of Cumbria, England. In the 2001 census the parish had a population of 173, increasing at the 2011 census to 196. The Parish sits at the southern border of the Lake District National Park. The name Broughton may have come about due to the area being home to a brook or stream.

History
Until the 18th Century the area which Broughton East is situated was known as Broughton which was under the control of a family that lived in the Manor of Cartmel. The parish was mainly made up of small farms who were tenants of the Manor of Cartmel and they would pay rent to the family. Records of some of the money collecting from the villagers show that oats and barley were grown by the villagers as William Mokeld took note of what he included around 1508-9 which was “a rent of 19d. each term, paying 15d. for service and 20d for ingress, with 1d. and a hen and a half for tithe hay and 9 bushels of oats and 6 pecks of barley for tithe corn”.

In the 1870s, Broughton East was described as:

BROUGHTON (East), or Broughton-Field, a township-chapelry in Cartmel parish, Lancashire; 4 miles N of Cartmel r. station, and 7 NE of Ulverstone. Post Town, Cartmel, under Newton-in-Cartmel. Acres, 2,830. Real property, £4,332. Pop., 534. Houses, 107.

One of the most noticeable developments of the town was the building of St Peter's church in 1894. The building was made of red sandstone and was built for £3,000.

Population 
The area of Broughton East has always had a generally small population with most people being farmers but the population was 534 by the 1870s and was nearly 1800 in 1890. In 1881 the parish had  maintained a part of the population involved in agriculture with over 50 people being involved in it, a large number of people however, especially females worked in domestic service with over 200 females and 50 males.

There was boundary changes in the early 1900s which changed to size of the parish leaving the parish with a population of around 200 which has stay constant since. The modern day parish is very different in terms of occupations compared with 1881 though. Only 103 residents, just over half the population were in employment as of 2011. Most of these jobs are in professional and managerial positions which together make up half the working population.

See also

Listed buildings in Broughton East

References

External links
 Cumbria County History Trust: Broughton East (nb: provisional research only – see Talk page)

Civil parishes in Cumbria